Dimitrios Theodorakis (born 11 September 1970) is a Greek sailor. He competed in the Laser event at the 1996 Summer Olympics.

References

External links
 

1970 births
Living people
Greek male sailors (sport)
Olympic sailors of Greece
Sailors at the 1996 Summer Olympics – Laser
Sailors (sport) from Athens
Competitors at the 1993 Mediterranean Games
Mediterranean Games silver medalists for Greece